Bill Montgomery (22 March 1915 – 12 April 1988) was  a former Australian rules footballer who played with North Melbourne in the Victorian Football League (VFL).

Notes

External links 
		

1915 births
1988 deaths
Australian rules footballers from Victoria (Australia)
North Melbourne Football Club players